Joseph Michael Partington (born 1 April 1990) is a professional footballer who plays as a defender for National League side Aldershot Town.
At under-21 level, Partington represented Wales on eight occasions between 2009 and 2012.

Club career
Born in Portsmouth, Partington joined AFC Bournemouth in June 2006 after being released by Portsmouth. He made his first team debut for Bournemouth on 9 February 2008, against Luton Town. Bournemouth won the game 4–1. Partington came on as a late substitute for Marvin Bartley.

On 5 April, Partington scored his first professional goal. This was a crucial goal at the Liberty Stadium in the 90th minute against top of the league side Swansea City. Moments after, Bournemouth scored another goal from Jo Kuffour to win the game 2–1. The goal scored against Swansea when he was 18 years 4 days old means he is currently the youngest player to score for Bournemouth in their history.

On 7 May, Bournemouth manager Kevin Bond announced he had offered Partington, along with youth team goalkeeper Ryan Pryce and winger Josh McQuoid a professional contract with the club. Partington made his full first team début against Bury on 20 December, scoring Bournemouth's second goal of the game in the 44th minute.

On 29 October 2010, Partington joined Eastbourne Borough of the Conference National on an initial one-month's loan in order to gain some first team experience.

The then Bournemouth manager Lee Bradbury offered Partington a new and improved two-and-a-half year contract on 4 February 2011 which he accepted. This will keep him at the club until the end of the 2012–13 season.

Partington's contract was extended by a further two years in June 2013 by current manager Eddie Howe who has stated that he is keen for Partington to convert to a centre half. To assist him in this on 1 January 2014 he signed for Conference Premier team Aldershot Town on a month's loan after turning down two League clubs who wanted to sign him as a central midfielder. He suffered an injury in a match against Dartford which required an operation to reconstruct his knee and kept him out for ten months.

Partington signed for Eastleigh in January 2015, after recovering from a knee injury, on an initial one-month loan, which was extended until the end of the 2014–15 season.

On 4 June 2015, Partington joined Eastleigh on a free transfer on a two-year deal after Bournemouth released him. On 25 July 2016 Eastleigh manager Chris Todd persuaded Partington to sign an extension to his contract that will keep him at the club until July 2018. Partington was also made captain of the first team for the 2016/17 season. This came after the fans of the club and his teammates presented him with all four of the 2015/16 end of season awards.

Bristol Rovers

On 13 January 2017, Partington joined League One side Bristol Rovers for an undisclosed fee, although Eastleigh stated that the fee that they received for Partington was a new club record. He made his debut for the club replacing Mark McChrystal in the second half of a 3–1 defeat to Fleetwood Town.

He was offered a new contract by Bristol Rovers at the end of the 2018–19 season.

Return to Eastleigh
On 13 June 2019, Partington returned to Eastleigh after rejecting a new contract at Bristol Rovers to allow him to focus on a new business, providing fitness camps for footballers in Hampshire. After the 2020/21 season, Partington departed Eastleigh after declining to sign a new contract with the club.

Bromley
On 1 July 2021, Partington joined Bromley. On 22 May 2022, Partington came on as a substitute in a 1–0 victory over Wrexham in the FA Trophy Final.

Aldershot Town
On 17 June 2022, Partington returned to former club Aldershot Town on a two-year deal having spent time on loan with them eight years prior.

International career
Partington chose to play for Wales, qualifying through his Welsh mother. He made his debut for the Wales under-19 team in July 2007 against Chile. Aged only 17 years and 4 months he was made captain of the Welsh under-19 team for the game against Turkey in the Milk Cup and has captained his country at this level nine times since. His first Welsh goal came in a 3–1 defeat against Hungary.

On 2 February 2009, Partington was called up to the Wales under-21 squad for the first time by manager Brian Flynn for a friendly against Northern Ireland on 10 February. Because the match was cancelled, he made his under-21 debut on 31 March 2009 against Luxembourg at Llanelli's Parc y Scarlets. Partington captained the Welsh under-21s for the first time on 17 November 2010 in a 1–0 win against Austria.

Personal life
Partington hosts the Leave No Doubt podcast which provides guidance on how to become a professional footballer, calling upon the advice of elite coaches and players. Launched in February 2022, the first episode saw Partington speak with former Arsenal and England international midfielder Jack Wilshere on how to maximise your potential.

Career statistics

Honours
AFC Bournemouth
EFL League Two runners-up: 2009–10

Bromley
FA Trophy Winners: 2021–22

References

External links

1990 births
Footballers from Portsmouth
Living people
Association football midfielders
English footballers
Welsh footballers
Wales youth international footballers
Wales under-21 international footballers
Portsmouth F.C. players
AFC Bournemouth players
Eastbourne Borough F.C. players
Aldershot Town F.C. players
Eastleigh F.C. players
Bristol Rovers F.C. players
Bromley F.C. players
English Football League players
National League (English football) players